Max Edwin Teichmann (20 August 1924 – 29 November 2008) was an Australian academic and political commentator.

Early years 
Born in Melbourne to a German-born father, also Max, and an Adelaide-born mother, Kathleen, Teichmann grew up in the working-class suburb of Carlton during the Great Depression. After leaving school, he worked as a junior journalist, then in 1942 joined the Australian army and saw action in Papua New Guinea.

Education
After the war, as an ex-serviceman, he enrolled in the University of Melbourne where he embarked on an academic career. He won a scholarship to Balliol College, Oxford, United Kingdom where he was taught by Isaiah Berlin, Max Beloff and John Plamenatz. While in the United Kingdom, Teichmann became involved in left-wing politics, joining Britain's Labour Party and Campaign for Nuclear Disarmament. He married the philosopher Jenny Teichman.

Political commentary
In 1964, he returned to Australia and took up a post in the department of politics at Monash University. He became active in the anti-Vietnam War movement in Australia and counted among his friends leading Australian Labor Party identities such as Jim Cairns and Bill Hayden.

Teichmann later adopted more conservative views and he became a fierce critic of the Left in Australia. Writing in the Australian Financial Review on 19 July 1999, Christopher Pearson listed Teichmann as one of several contemporary Australian political commentators who had commenced on the Left but had become conservatives later on in their careers. Pearson asserted that "Teichmann's position evolved primarily in response to the Left". So much so that his "critique of parasitism in the institutional Left, old and new, made him a heretical presence at Monash".

Columnist
Teichmann retired from Monash in 1989. He went on to work as a regular columnist with The Adelaide Review from the mid-1990s until 2002. He also regularly wrote articles for Quadrant, News Weekly and National Observer up until his death in November 2008.

Bibliography

External links
"Intellect of the left frightened the right" Obituary in The Age
"He chose the Left as his target" Obituary in The Australian
"Writer, academic and raconteur fondly remembered" Obituary in News Weekly

1924 births
2008 deaths
Australian academics
Australian columnists
Australian people of German descent
Quadrant (magazine) people
Australian Army personnel of World War II